Hirvisaari is a Finnish surname. Notable people with the surname include:

James Hirvisaari (born 1960), Finnish politician
Laila Hirvisaari (1938–2021), Finnish writer

References

Finnish-language surnames